Monstera guzmanjacobiae is a species of plant in the family Araceae from Mexico.

Distribution 
It is endemic to the Los Tuxtlas region in Veracruz, Mexico.

Description
Monstera guzmanjacobiae is a hemi-epiphytic herb that can reach 25 m above the ground.

References 

guzmanjacobiae
Endemic flora of Mexico
Flora of Veracruz
Plants described in 2020